Jean-Paul Vergne (born 13 March 1970) is a French rower. He competed in the men's coxed four event at the 1992 Summer Olympics.

References

1970 births
Living people
French male rowers
Olympic rowers of France
Rowers at the 1992 Summer Olympics
Sportspeople from Lot-et-Garonne